Nigilu is a Sepik language spoken in East Sepik Province, Papua-New Guinea.

References

Bahinemo languages
Languages of East Sepik Province